Panahon Ko 'to!: Ang Game Show ng Buhay Ko (Lit. This Is My Time!: The Game Show of My Life) was a Philippine trivia game show broadcast by ABS-CBN, hosted by the duo Luis Manzano and Billy Crawford from Pilipinas Got Talent. The program premiered on June 28, 2010, and Originally aired every weekday afternoons from 5:00PM to 5:30PM on the network's Hapontastic afternoon block. On September 29, 2010 onwards, the program moved its timeslot to 10:00AM to 10:30AM on the network's ' Umaganda morning block. The game show permanently ended on November 26, 2010.

Panahon Ko 'to! can be also seen every Tuesday mornings at 6:30 AM to 7:30 AM on Jeepney TV. However, it is moved to Thursday since July 2, 2021.

Format
Five teams of three players, one ranging from 13–19 years old, one ranging from the 20–45 years old, and one who is 46 years old or older, will answer a variety of pop culture questions from the 1960s to the 2000s. During the show's first four weeks, teams are composed of celebrities.

Ito ang Gusto Ko!
Five teams will play against each other in questions that are all about Filipino favorites. Questions will be presented in various types such as seen below:

A category is also given for each quiz as a hint to the answer. Each team will have three seconds to answer the question, and the first answer is their final answer. If a team answers wrong, they will be out for one round. When a team correctly answers two quizzes, they go to round two. The first three teams will advance.

Hot na Hot
The three winning teams will answer questions ranging from the 1960s to the 2000s. The initials of an answer will be given as a clue. Each correct answer is worth 10 points, while answering an "Extra Hot" question is worth 20 points. The first team to get 70 points will have a chance to play the jackpot round.

Sinong Sikat?
One team member will voluntarily be chosen for the jackpot round. The team member must guess the celebrity hidden in seven stars. To get the stars off, questions must be answered in 60 seconds. Each star is worth P5,000. After 60 seconds, they must give the full name of the celebrity. If the guess is correct, the team wins P100,000.

Awards
 2011 - 25th PMPC Star Awards for TV (Best Game Show) - Panahon Ko 'to! - (Won)
 2011 - 25th PMPC Star Awards for TV (Best Game Show Host) - Luis Manzano and Billy Crawford - (Nominated)

See also
List of programs aired by ABS-CBN

References

External links
Official website

ABS-CBN original programming
Philippine game shows
2010 Philippine television series debuts
2010 Philippine television series endings
Filipino-language television shows